Assumption High School (AHS) is a public secondary school located at 4880 Highway 308 in Assumption Parish, Louisiana, United States, north of the city of Napoleonville. It is a part of the Assumption Parish School Board.

The sole high school in Assumption Parish, it takes students from all parts of the parish, including Napoleonville, Labadieville, Pierre Part, Bayou L'Ourse, and Belle Rose.

Academics 
Assumption High School is a comprehensive public senior high school. The school offers an honors program, an Advanced Placement (AP) program, and a dual enrollment program. Dual enrollment classes are offered to eligible juniors and seniors through L. E. Fletcher Technical Community College. The available AP courses are as follows: human geography, calculus, civics, and biology II. The school offers dual enrollment programs for English language and composition (English III), English literature and composition (English III), U.S. history, world history, and psychology.

Freshman Academy 
In 2012, Assumption High School opened a freshman academy, which serves all freshman and houses the majority of freshman classes.

Clubs and organizations

 Band 
 Booster Club 
 Class officers (senior, junior, sophomore, freshman)
 Computer Club
 Cooperative Office Education (COE)
 Library Club 
 Fellowship of Christian Athletes (FCA)
 French Club 
 Future Farmers of America (FFA)
 Jobs for Louisiana Graduates (JAG)
 Mu Alpha Theta (Math Club)
 National Honor Society (NHS)
 NJROTC (Naval Junior Reserve Officer Training Corps)
 Quiz Bowl 
 Relay For Life
 Science Club 
 Student Council 
 4-H
 HOSA (Future Health Professionals)

Student media 
Le Stang & The Stampede serves as the school's newspaper. The school's official yearbook is The Roundup.

Mascot
The Assumption High School mascot is the mustang. Assumption High has named its mascot "Sally" in keeping with the song "Mustang Sally".

Athletics
Assumption High athletics competes in the LHSAA.

Sports sponsored by the school include:

 American football
 Baseball
 Basketball
 Cross country
 Dance Team
 Fishing
 Golf 
 Gymnastics
 Softball 
 Tennis
 Track and field  
 Volleyball

Championships
Football championships
(1) State Championship: 1964

Notable alumni
Dan Brouillete, former United States Secretary of Energy 
Troy E. Brown, former member of the Louisiana State Senate
Terrence Cooks, former linebacker in the NFL
Brandon Jacobs, two-time Super Bowl winner, former running back for the New York Giants
Johnny Meads, linebacker for Houston Oilers and Washington Redskins
Charles Melancon, former member of the United States House of Representatives for Louisiana's 3rd congressional district
Jordan Mills, former offensive tackle in the NFL
Tramon Williams, Super Bowl XLV champion defensive back for the Green Bay Packers
Kim Willoughby, 2008 U.S. indoor volleyball Olympian, former University of Hawaii volleyball player, 2003 AVCA NCAA National Player of the Year

References

External links
 
 

Public high schools in Louisiana
Schools in Assumption Parish, Louisiana
1948 establishments in Louisiana
Educational institutions established in 1948